Oriskany Creek is a  river in New York, United States.  It rises in Madison County and flows northeastward, primarily through Oneida County.  Oriskany Creek is a tributary of the Mohawk River and therefore part of the Hudson River watershed.

Oriskany Creek is wide and shallow, affording passage to only canoes, and that for only part of its length.  The creek is known for its brown trout, which are caught from the shore or by wading.

History 
The Oneida village of Oriska was located near the mouth of the creek, by the Mohawk River.

During the American Revolutionary War, part of the Battle of Oriskany was fought in a swampy, steep ravine, near the mouth of the river.

When settlers arrived, the creek became the power source of many mills along its course.

The creek was an important source of water for the former Chenango Canal, which linked the Southern Tier of New York to the Erie Canal.

Communities along the creek 

Clark Mills
Clinton
Colemans Mills
Deansboro
Farmers Mills
Kirkland
Oriskany
Oriskany Falls
Solsville
Walesville

See also 
List of rivers in New York

References

Rivers of New York (state)
Mohawk River
Rivers of Madison County, New York
Rivers of Oneida County, New York